Ellis Cone is one of several small cones or cone remnants along the southwest side of Toney Mountain in Marie Byrd Land, Antarctica. It was mapped by the United States Geological Survey from surveys and U.S. Navy air photos, 1959–66, and was named by the Advisory Committee on Antarctic Names for Homer L. Ellis, ACC, U.S. Navy, radar air traffic controller at McMurdo Station, winter party 1968, and chief in charge of the ground controlled approach unit at the Byrd Station skiway landing strip, summer season, 1969–70.

References 

Volcanoes of Marie Byrd Land